Damian Richard Matacz (born 28 February 1979) is an Australian former professional basketball player who is most well known for his 18 seasons with the Joondalup Wolves in the State Basketball League (SBL). A former college player for Northern Michigan University, Matacz also had two short stints in the National Basketball League (NBL) and played in New Zealand, Ireland, Germany and Switzerland. He represented the Irish national team in 2008.

Early life
Matacz was born and raised in Perth, Western Australia, and moved to the United States in the mid-1990s to attend Greenville High School in Greenville, Michigan. At Greenville, he earned all-conference honours with the basketball team in 1997.

College career
In 1998, Matacz enrolled at Northern Michigan University and joined the Wildcats men's basketball program. He played four seasons for the Wildcats and served as co-captain as a junior and senior. He was the team's Newcomer of the Year in 1999 and MVP in 2001 and 2002. He was also named GLIAC North Division all-conference second team in 2001 and all-conference first team in 2002. In 113 career games, he recorded 1,355 points (12.0 pg) and 715 rebounds (6.3 pg). At Northern Michigan, he majored in finance.

Professional career

Wanneroo Wolves (1999–2009)
In 1999, Matacz debuted in the State Basketball League (SBL) for the Wanneroo Wolves. He played his second season for the Wolves in 2001 and went on to play every year until 2009.

Australian NBL, New Zealand, and Europe (2002–2010)
After graduating from Northern Michigan University, Matacz returned to Perth and spent time with the Perth Wildcats during the 2002–03 NBL season. He played two games for the Wildcats, including 20 seconds on 12 October against the Wollongong Hawks and just under six minutes on 18 January against the Canberra Cannons. In the second game, he had six points, two rebounds and one assist.

In 2004, Matacz moved to New Zealand to play for the Canterbury Rams of the New Zealand NBL. In 18 games, he averaged 9.8 points and 6.6 rebounds per game.

For the 2004–05 season, Matacz moved to Ireland to play for UCC Demons of the Irish Superleague. He helped Demons win the championship and averaged 21 points, 11.9 rebounds, 1.8 blocks and 1.7 assists in 22 games.

For the 2005–06 season, Matacz moved to Germany to play for TB Weiden of the 2. Basketball Bundesliga. In 13 games for Weiden, he averaged 12.4 points and 6.5 rebounds per game. He finished the season with a two-game stint in Switzerland with BBC Martigny-Ovronnaz.

In September 2007, Matacz initially signed with Spanish team Rhino's Xiria de Carballo. However, after joining the Singapore Slingers for the first two games of the 2007–08 NBL season, he parted ways with Carballo. He played for the Slingers in Singapore on 19 September against the Melbourne Tigers and in Perth against the Wildcats on 23 September.

In July 2010, Matacz played for a team representing Australia at the William Jones Cup in Taipei. The team went 0–6 at the tournament.

Later years with the Wolves (2011–2019)
After a year away from the Wolves in 2010, Matacz returned to Wanneroo in 2011 and helped the team reach the grand final. In his first SBL Grand Final, Matacz scored 15 points in an 88–83 win over the Perry Lakes Hawks. With the Wolves in 2012, he was named the SBL's Most Valuable Player. After a grand final loss in 2013, Matacz retired from the SBL. He won his sixth and final Club MVP in 2013.

Matacz came out of retirement in 2015 and helped the Wolves return to the SBL Grand Final, where he won his second championship with a 105–75 win over the South West Slammers. He went on to play his 300th SBL game in June 2016, and his 350th SBL game in May 2018. After winning the championship in 2015, the Wolves reached the grand final every year between 2016 and 2019, but fell short to finish as runners-up each year.

In September 2019, Matacz retired from the SBL for the second and final time. In 385 games, he scored 6,412 points.

National team career
Matacz represented the Irish national team in 2008, playing in the Emerald Hoops International Series in August and the FIBA EuroBasket 2009 Division B qualifiers in September.

Personal life
Matacz is the son of Karl and Anne Matacz, and he has a brother, Lucas, and a sister, Rochelle. He is married to former Women's SBL player Jessica Matacz (née Spinner).

Matacz holds an Irish passport.

References

External links

Matacz's SBL stats 2009–2019

1979 births
Living people
Australian men's basketball players
Australian expatriate basketball people in the United States
Canterbury Rams players
Centers (basketball)
Northern Michigan Wildcats men's basketball players
Perth Wildcats players
Power forwards (basketball)
Singapore Slingers players